"Living Doll" is the 126th episode of the American television anthology series The Twilight Zone. In this episode, a dysfunctional family's problems are made worse when the child's doll proves to be sentient.

Opening narration

Plot
Annabelle buys her daughter, Christie, a wind-up doll named "Talky Tina" in order to comfort her. When wound, the doll says, "My name is Talky Tina and I love you very much." Annabelle has recently remarried to an infertile man named Erich Streator. Frustrated by his inability to have his own children with Annabelle, Erich directs his hostility toward Christie (he also becomes upset with Annabelle for wasting money by purchasing the doll). Annabelle tries to persuade him that if he gives himself the chance, he will be able to love Christie.

When Erich is alone and he winds up the doll, it substitutes its catchphrase with antagonisms such as "I don't like you". At first, Erich blames the doll's manufacturer. However, when the doll begins engaging him in a more elaborate conversation, he comes to the conclusion that Annabelle is playing a trick to get back at him for his treatment of Christie. He places the doll in a trash can in the garage, but then receives a phone call and hears the doll's voice threatening to kill him. Checking the trash can, he finds it empty. He confronts Annabelle, but she pleads innocence. It occurs to Erich that since his wife was upstairs putting Christie to bed, she could not possibly have made the phone ring.

He runs upstairs to find the doll in bed with Christie. Erich takes the doll away against Christie's tearful protests and angrily corrects her when she addresses him as "Daddy". He attempts to destroy the doll using a vise, a blow torch and a circular saw, all to no effect; Annabelle attempts to intervene but Erich pushes her away. He then ties the doll in a burlap sack and returns it to the trash can, weighing the lid with bricks. Annabelle begins packing to leave, unable to tolerate his hostility and irrational behavior any longer. She says that Erich should see a psychiatrist. Erich begins to question whether the doll talking to him was just his imagination, and he offers to return it to Christie if Annabelle will stay. He takes the doll out of the trash and returns it to Christie.

Later that night, Erich is awakened by muffled noises. He tells Annabelle to stay in the bedroom, and leaves to investigate. Christie is in bed, but Tina is gone. Going down the stairs, he trips over Tina, who is lying on one of the treads, and falls, sustaining seemingly fatal injuries. Attracted by the noise, Annabelle finds Erich's body. Beside him is Tina, who opens her eyes and threatens Annabelle by saying, "My name is Talky Tina... and you'd better be nice to me!" Realizing that Erich was telling the truth, Annabelle drops the doll in shock.

Closing narration

Cast
 Telly Savalas as Erich Streator
 Mary La Roche as  Annabelle Streator
 Tracy Stratford as  Christie Streator
 June Foray as  Talky Tina (voice) [uncredited] 
Mary La Roche, Tracy Stratford as well as June Foray each worked in one other episode of the original series. La Roche was one of two female leads in first season's last episode "A World of His Own" (July 1960), Stratford was uncredited as third season's "Little Girl Lost" (March 1962) and Foray was again uncredited as the voice of Mary Badham's character in the series' final episode "The Bewitchin' Pool" (June 1964).

Episode notes
The score composed by Bernard Herrmann consists of a solo bass clarinet, flourished by harps and celesta. This ensemble creates the sinister tone appropriate for the episode's mood.

The house in this episode also was used in "Ring-a-Ding Girl" (1963), another Twilight Zone episode.

The doll used for Talky Tina was produced by the Vogue Doll Company between 1959 and 1961 and marketed under the name "Brikette". Contrary to its depiction on The Twilight Zone, Brikette was a non-talker; however, in its televised portrayal as Tina it was modeled after Chatty Cathy, a popular talking doll being manufactured by Mattel toy company at the time "Living Doll" premiered. The voices for both Talky Tina and the original Chatty Cathy dolls were provided by June Foray, one of the leading voice actresses of the era.

In popular culture

"Living Doll" is parodied in "Clown Without Pity", a segment of The Simpsons episode "Treehouse of Horror III". In the story Homer gives Bart a talking Krusty the Clown doll for his birthday, and the toy tries to kill Homer.

"Living Doll" is also parodied in the "Little Talky Tabitha!" episode of Johnny Bravo.

The character of Gabby Gabby in the 2019 film Toy Story 4 is inspired by Talky Tina, according to director Josh Cooley.

Parodied in the episode “Good Will Haunting” of Sabrina the Teenage Witch where a “Molly Dolly” doll threatens Sabrina.

See also
Killer toy
Child's Play, a 1988 horror film about a murderous, talking doll, partially inspired by the episode
Annabelle
Dolly Dearest
Poppy Playtime, a 2021 independent horror game featuring the titular doll

References

DeVoe, Bill. (2008). Trivia from The Twilight Zone. Albany, GA: Bear Manor Media. 
Grams, Martin. (2008). The Twilight Zone: Unlocking the Door to a Television Classic. Churchville, MD: OTR Publishing. 
Zicree, Marc Scott: The Twilight Zone Companion.  Sillman-James Press, 1982 (second edition)

External links

The Twilight Zone (1959 TV series season 5) episodes
1963 American television episodes
Compositions by Bernard Herrmann
Sentient toys in fiction
Television episodes written by Jerry Sohl